MVP (Hangul: 엠브이피) was a South Korean boy band formed by PH Entertainment in 2017. They debuted on March 13, 2017, with Manifest.

On February 16, 2022, Rayoon posted an Instagram post with the caption revealing that the group had disbanded.

Members
 Kanghan (강한)
 Rayoon (라윤)
 Gitaek (기택)
 P.K. (피케이)
 Jin (진)
 Been (빈)
 Sion (시온)

Discography

Extended plays

Singles

References

K-pop music groups
Musical groups established in 2017
South Korean boy bands
South Korean dance music groups
South Korean pop music groups
Musical groups from Seoul
2017 establishments in South Korea
2022 disestablishments in South Korea